The 1932 Baltic Cup was held in Riga, Latvia from 28 to 30 August 1932. It was the fifth time three Baltic countries — Estonia, Latvia and Lithuania — came together to play a friendly tournament and determine the best team amongst them. Latvia won the tournament, beating both opponents.

Results

Statistics

Goalscorers

See also
Balkan Cup
Nordic Football Championship

References

External links
 Tournament overview at EU-Football.info

1932
1932–33 in European football
1932 in Lithuanian football
1932 in Latvian football
1932 in Estonian football
1932